LCRA may refer to:

 Lower Colorado River Authority, a public utility in Texas, United States
 Local Community Radio Act, a broadcast law in the United States
 Liga Colombiana de Radioaficionados, the national amateur radio organization in Colombia
 The ICAO code for RAF Akrotiri, a military airbase in Akrotiri, Cyprus